Schizothorax myzostomus is a species of ray-finned fish in the genus Schizothorax which is found in Yunnan.

References 

Schizothorax
Fish described in 1964